The Drug Traffic is a 1923 American silent crime drama film directed by Irving Cummings and starring Robert Walker, Gladys Brockwell and Barbara Tennant. It was produced independently and released on a state-by-state basis.

Synopsis
A successful surgeon, weary due to his long and stressful days, starts taking shots of drugs to pep him up. Before long he is an addict and his career and personal life collapse.

Cast
 Robert Walker as Willie Shade
 Gladys Brockwell as Edna Moore
 Barbara Tennant as Mary Larkin
 Ben Hewlett as Harry

References

Bibliography
 Connelly, Robert B. The Silents: Silent Feature Films, 1910-36, Volume 40, Issue 2. December Press, 1998.
 Munden, Kenneth White. The American Film Institute Catalog of Motion Pictures Produced in the United States, Part 1. University of California Press, 1997.

External links
 

1923 films
1923 drama films
American silent feature films
American drama films
Films directed by Irving Cummings
American black-and-white films
1920s American films
Silent American drama films